Grega Žemlja, who was the defending champion, reached the final, where he lost to Nicolás Massú 3–6, 5–7.

Seeds

Draw

Finals

Top half

Bottom half

References
 Main Draw
 Qualifying Draw

Abierto Internacional Varonil Casablanca Cancun - Singles
Abierto Internacional Varonil Casablanca Cancún